Judo is one of the sports at the quadrennial Mediterranean Games competition. It has been a sport in the program of the Mediterranean Games since its inception in 1971.

Editions

All-time medal table
Updated after the most recent 2022 Mediterranean Games

Best results by event and nation (2001-current)

Best results by event and nation (1979-1997)

Best results by event and nation (1971-1975)

References

External links
Mediterranean Games 1971 Results (PDF file)
Mediterranean Games 1975 Results (PDF file)
Mediterranean Games 1979 Results (PDF file)
Mediterranean Games 1983 Results (PDF file)
Mediterranean Games 1987 Results (PDF file)
Mediterranean Games 1991 Results (PDF file)
Mediterranean Games 1993 Results (PDF file)
Mediterranean Games 1997 Results (PDF file)
Mediterranean Games 2001 Results (PDF file)
Mediterranean Games 2005 Results (PDF file)
Official website of the 2009 Mediterranean Games (archived)
Official website of the 2013 Mediterranean Games (archived)

 
J
Mediterranean Games